Veles, also known as Volos, is a major god of earth, waters, livestock, and the underworld in Slavic paganism. His mythology and powers are similar, though not identical, to those of (among other deities) Odin, Loki and Hermes.

According to reconstruction by some researchers, he is the opponent of the supreme thunder god Perun. As such he probably has been imagined as a dragon, which in the belief of the pagan Slavs is a chimeric being resembling a cross between a bear and a snake that devours livestock. His tree is the willow, while that of Perun is the oak.
No direct accounts survive, but reconstructionists speculate that he may directly continue aspects of the Proto-Indo-European pantheon with the original deity Welnos.

Sources
Veles is one of few Slavic gods for which evidence of offerings can be found in all Slavic nations. The Primary Chronicle, a historical record of the early Kievan Rus, is the earliest and most important record, mentioning a god named Volos several times. Here, Volos is mentioned as god of cattle and peasants, who will punish oath-breakers with diseases, the opposite of Perun who is described as a ruling god of war who punishes by death in battle. In the later half of the 10th century, Veles or Volos was one of seven gods whose statues Vladimir I of Kiev had erected in his city. It is very interesting that Veles' statue apparently did not stand next to others, on the hill where the prince's castle was, but lower in the city, in the marketplace. Not only does this indicate that Veles was connected with commerce, but it also shows that worship of Perun and Veles had to be kept separate: while it was proper for Perun's shrines to be built high, on the top of the hill, Veles' place was down, in the lowlands.

A similar pattern can be observed among the South Slavs. Here the name of Veles appears only in toponyms, the best-known of which is the city of Veles in Macedonia, over which looms a hill of St. Elias the Thunderer. Also, in Bosnia and Herzegovina, a part of Sarajevo is called Velešići and a mountain Velež near Mostar, Herzegovina. Other examples are Veles in Western Serbia, Velesnica on the Danube and Velestovo in Montenegro and also the township of Velestino (Βελεστίνο, today Φέρες), apparently bearing testimony to a Slavic layer in the settlement of Thessaly. Another debatable if not improbable example  is the town of Volosko in Croatia, situated on the seashore under the peak of Mount Učka, nicknamed Perun.

Among Western Slavs, the name can be principally found in 15th and 16th century Czech records, where it means either dragon or devil.

Etymology

Presumably it is not possible to conclusively determine a definite etymology for the name of the god Veles, though there are several Proto-Indo-European roots that are all closely related to the nature of Veles and his domains.

One possibility is that the name derives from the Proto-Indo-European root *wel-, meaning wool. This seems plausible, since in Slavic cosmology Veles in serpentine form is lying in a nest of black wool in the roots of the Tree of the World and Veles is the shepherd of the dead. Volos is also the Russian and Ukrainian word for "hair" and Veles is hairy in his beastly form (bear, wolf).

The Proto-Indo-European root *welg- also means 'humid, wet'. Nothing is more connected with Veles than humidity and wetness. His domain is down, 'у воду пот корч пот колоду' ("in the water, below the tree stump and the log").

There is also the Indo-European word *woltus meaning 'meadow' which is derived from the same root. Accordingly, Veles is the shepherd of the dead who was imagined to browse the deceased on green lush meadows in the underworld.

The name is also related to Slavic terminology for oxen, for which the South Slavs, Russians, and Poles use "вол/vol/wół". Volos can also be a derivation from the same root by Eastern Slavic phonetic laws, now considered the most probable explanation for this phonetic form.

Veles is presumed to be or to represent the same figure as Vala, the enemy of the Vedic thunder god Indra. Other scholarship suggests a closer connection to characters of Baltic mythology, such as Velnias, Velns (Latvian) or Vėlinas (Lithuanian), a devil-like entity and enemy of the Baltic thunder-god Perkūnas (cf. Slavic Perun). Scholar Marija Gimbutas cited "related" etymons: Lithuanian veles 'shades of the dead' and Latvian Vels 'god of the underworld', which seem to indicate Veles's connection to the underworld. An ancient Russian word, Vlasezhelische, probably refers to the place where Veles dwells, "the underground kingdom or an entrance to it".

Enemy of Perun and storm myth
The Russian philologists Vyacheslav Ivanov and Vladimir Toporov reconstructed the mythical battle of Perun and Veles through comparative study of various Indo-European mythologies and a large number of Slavic folk stories and songs. A unifying characteristic of all Indo-European mythologies is a story about a battle between a god of thunder and a huge serpent or a dragon. In the Slavic version of the myth, Perun is a god of thunder while Veles acts as a dragon who opposes him, consistent with the Vala etymology; he is also similar to the Etruscan underworld monster Vetha and to the dragon Illuyankas, enemy of the storm god of Hittite mythology.

The reason for the enmity between the two gods is Veles's theft of Perun's son, wife, or, usually, cattle. It is also an act of challenge: Veles, in the form of a huge serpent, slithers from the caves of the underworld and coils up the Slavic world tree towards Perun's heavenly domain. Perun retaliates and attacks Veles with his lightning bolts. Veles flees, hiding or transforming himself into trees, animals or people. In the end, he is killed by Perun and in this ritual death, whatever Veles stole is released from his battered body in the form of rain falling from the skies. This "storm myth", or "divine battle", as it is generally called by scholars today, explained to ancient Slavs the changing of seasons through the year. The dry periods were interpreted as the chaotic results of Veles' thievery. Storms and lightning were seen as divine battles. The ensuing rain was the triumph of Perun over Veles and the re-establishment of world order. On a deeper level, as has been said above, Perun's place is up, high and dry and Veles' down, low and wet. By climbing up into the sphere of Perun, Veles disrupts the equilibrium of the world and needs to be put in his place. Perun achieves this in a fierce battle, smiting his adversary with lightning and driving him back down into his proper place, the watery realm lying beneath the roots of the cosmic tree (axis mundi). Order thus restored, the two gods cease hostilities until the next time that Veles tries to crawl up into Perun's realm.

The myth was cyclical, repeating itself each year. The death of Veles was never permanent; he would reform himself as a serpent who would shed its old skin and would be reborn in a new body. Although in this particular myth he plays a negative role as bringer of chaos, Veles was not seen as an evil god by ancient Slavs. In fact, in many of the Russian folk tales, Veles, appearing under the Christian guise of St. Nicholas, saves the poor farmer and his cattle from the furious and destructive St. Elias the Thunderer, who represents Perun.
The duality and conflict of Perun and Veles does not represent the dualistic clash of good and evil; rather, it is the opposition of the natural principles of earth and water (Veles) against heaven/sky and fire (Perun).

The Ivanov/Toporov conception of "the key myth" of Slavic mythology has been criticized by several authors, including Leo Klejn and Igor M. Diakonoff. Many, including Klejn, pointed out that Ivanov and Toporov often tended toward unjustified generalizations and considered many of their arguments "far-fetched". Supporters of the theory, on the other hand, include Boris Uspensky, T. Sudnik and T. Tsivyan, and others.

God of magic and musicians
According to Ivanov and Toporov, Veles' portrayal as having a penchant for mischief is evident both from his role in the storm myth and in carnival customs of Koledari shamans. In his role as a trickster god, he is in some ways similar to both Greek Hermes and Scandinavian Loki. He was connected with magic. The word volhov, obviously derived from his name, in some Slavic languages still means sorcerer while in the 12th century Ruthenian epic The Tale of Igor's Campaign, the character of Boyan the wizard is called Veles' grandson. Veles was also believed to be protector of travelling musicians. For instance, in some wedding ceremonies of northern Croatia (which continued up to the 20th century), the music would not start playing unless the bridegroom, when making a toast, spilled some of the wine on the ground, preferably over the roots of the nearest tree. The symbolism of this is clear, even though forgotten long ago by those still performing it: the musicians will not sing until a toast is made to their patron deity.

Post-Christian Veles
After the advent of Christianity, Veles was split into several different characters. As a god of the underworld and dragons, he became identified with the Devil. His more benevolent sides were transformed to several Christian saints. As a protector of cattle, he became associated with Saint Blaise, popularly known among various Slavic nations as St. Vlaho, St. Blaz, or St. Vlasiy (Armenian: Սուրբ Վլասի; germ: Blasius; fr: Blaise; sp: San Blas; port: São Brás; it: San Biagio; Croat: sv. Blaž; eng: Blase;  Greek: Άγιος Βλάσιος). In Yaroslavl, for example, the first church built on the site of Veles's pagan shrine was dedicated to St Blaise, for the latter's name was similar to Veles and he was likewise considered a heavenly patron of shepherds. As mentioned already, in many Eastern Slavic folk tales, he was replaced by St. Nicholas, probably because the popular stories of the saint describe him as a giver of wealth and a sort of trickster.

Honors
Veles Bastion on Brabant Island, Antarctica is named after the deity.

See also
 Volosovo, a town in Leningrad Oblast, Russia
 Chaoskampf, the battle between Indo-European thunder gods and their chaotic serpentine opponents
 Golosov Ravine—ancient Veles shrine in Moscow, Russia
 Jormungandr, the world-serpent of Norse mythology
 Typhon, primordial serpent of Greco-Roman mythology
 Velež Mountain in Herzegovina
 Vritra, brother of Vala in Hindu myth and enemy of Indra; he steals Usas, the rivers/waters, and cattle, which Indra must free
 Veles, North Macedonia, a town in North Macedonia
 Velestovo, Montenegro, a village in Montenegro
 Velestovo, Ohrid, a village in North Macedonia
 Volosko, a village in Croatia

Notes

References

Further reading
 Biezais, Haralds. "Geschichte Und Struktur Der Balto-slavischen Religion". In: Anthropos 81, no. 1/3 (1986): 151–76. Accessed May 4, 2021. http://www.jstor.org/stable/40462030.
 Borenović, Mirjana. "René Girard’s Scapegoating and Stereotypes of Persecution in the Divine Battle between Veles and Perun". In: Bogoslovni vestnik [Theological Quarterly] 79 (2019) 4. pp. 1039–1052. DOI: https://doi.org/10.34291/BV2019/04/Borenovic
 Ivanković, M. "New Insights on Slavic God Volosъ / Velesъ from a Vedic Perspective" [Novi uvidi o staroslovenskom bogu Volosu / Velesu iz vedske perspektive]. In: Studia Mythologica Slavica 22: 55–81. Available from: https://ojs.zrc-sazu.si/sms/article/view/7597
 Kropej, Monika (2003). “Cosmology and Deities in Slovene Folk Narrative and Song Tradition" [Kozmologija in boštva V Slovenskem Ljudskem Pripovednem in pesniškem izročilu]". In: Studia Mythologica Slavica 6 (May). Ljubljana, Slovenija, 131-134. https://doi.org/10.3986/sms.v6i0.1780.
 Łuczyński, Michał. 2012. “Kognitywna Definicja Welesa~Wołosa: Etnolingwistyczna próba Rekonstrukcji Fragmentu słowiańskiego Tradycyjnego Mitologicznego Obrazu świata" [Cognitive Definition of Weles~Wołos: An Attempt at Reconstruction of a Fragment of the Traditional Mythological Appearance of the Slavic World]. Studia Mythologica Slavica 15 (1). Ljubljana, Slovenija, 169–78. https://doi.org/10.3986/sms.v15i1.1581.
 Lyle, Emily. "Indo-European Time and the Perun-Veles Combat". In: Studia Mythologica Slavica XII. 2009. pp. 147–152.

External links

Animal gods
Abundance gods
Commerce gods
Dragons
Earth gods
Harvest gods
Magic gods
Pastoral gods
Slavic gods
Trickster gods
Underworld gods
Water gods
Music and singing gods
Psychopomps
Supernatural beings identified with Christian saints